Lockhart High School is a public high school located in Lockhart, Texas, United States and classified as a 5A school by the University Interscholastic League (UIL). It is part of the Lockhart Independent School District located in central Caldwell County. In 2015, the school was rated "Met Standard" by the Texas Education Agency.

Athletics
The Lockhart Lions compete in these sports - 

Baseball
Basketball
Cross Country
Football
Golf
Powerlifting
Soccer
Softball
Tennis
Track and Field
Volleyball
Marching Band
Color Guard

State Titles
Boys Cross Country 
1998(4A), 2000(4A)

References

External links
Lockhart ISD

Public high schools in Texas
Schools in Caldwell County, Texas